Faith of My Fathers is a 2005 American biographical drama television film directed by Peter Markle and written by Markle and William Bingham, based on the 1999 memoir of the same name by United States Senator and former United States Navy aviator John McCain (with Mark Salter). It aired on A&E on Memorial Day, May 30, 2005.

Filmed in New Orleans, Faith of My Fathers is based on the story of Lieutenant Commander John McCain's experiences as a prisoner of war in North Vietnam for five and a half years during the Vietnam War, interleaved with his memories of growing up in a heritage rich with military service. Shawn Hatosy stars as John McCain, with Scott Glenn as his father, Admiral Jack McCain. Of the North Vietnamese captors, Chi Muoi Lo plays the keyman "Prick" and Cary-Hiroyuki Tagawa plays prison commander "Cat".

Plot

John McCain flies his jet from a carrier on a bombing mission over Hanoi, North Vietnam. As a warning buzzer announces incoming missiles, McCain stays with the bomb drop, but is hit by a missile. He lands in the water and is pulled ashore by an angry mob, and taken prisoner. Asked to give information, he gives out the names of the Green Bay Packers rather than of his squadron. In flashbacks, his father tells of how his submarine escaped destruction in World War II, and told him not to worry about his grades, as his father and grandfather "really fooled them" by rising to admiral despite doing poorly in school. In prison, McCain sees other prisoners cruelly tortured, while he sees a couple who appear to have decided to cooperate with the enemy. McCain is given a choice to be released early in recognition that his father is commander of U.S. forces in the Pacific, but he refuses, and suffers for it. During a stepped-up bombing campaign, the prisoners sing "Silent Night", after which negotiations result in a release of prisoners and a trip home.

Cast
 Shawn Hatosy as John McCain
 Scott Glenn as Jack McCain
 Cary-Hiroyuki Tagawa as Cat
 Joe Chrest as Craner
 Chi Muoi Lo as Prick
 Erin Cottrell as Carol McCain
 Troy Ruptash as Bud Day
 Shea Whigham as Norris Overly
 Brian F. Durkin as Henry Witt
 Nick Gomez as Becker
 Michael Arata as Captain Hart
 Korbi Dean as Roberta McCain

Production
Faith of My Fathers was shot in New Orleans. Filming locations included the former Falstaff Brewery (as the Hanoi Hilton) and Tulane University (as the United States Naval Academy).

Reception
When initially aired, the film had 3.7 million viewers, and was A&E's highest-rated program in over a year.

Reviews for Faith of My Fathers were mixed, with Variety calling the treatment an "earnest adaptation" and "a stark, by-the-numbers account of the horrors POWs endured in Vietnam", while The Washington Post said the film was "serviceable" but fell short of McCain's "much more nuanced" memoir. The New York Times said the film lacked complexity and texture, but that it was "a respectful, moving view of a veteran's effort to pay respects to his family and fellow P.O.W.'s."

The film was nominated for four Primetime Emmy Awards, in categories involving art direction, cinematography, and editing, but did not win any of them. It was also a nominee for the American Society of Cinematographers Awards of 2005. It was released to DVD by Sony Pictures Television on August 30, 2005.

A DVD of the film was commercially released in June 2008 by Sony Pictures Entertainment, and was also used as a contribution reward by McCain's 2008 presidential campaign.

See also
 Early life and military career of John McCain

References

External links
 

2005 films
2005 biographical drama films
2000s American films
2000s English-language films
2000s prison drama films
2000s war drama films
A&E (TV network) original films
American aviation films
American biographical drama films
American drama television films
American prison drama films
American war drama films
Biographical films about aviators
Biographical films about military personnel
Biographical television films
Films about father–son relationships
Films about shot-down aviators
Films about the United States Navy
Films based on memoirs
Films directed by Peter Markle
Films set in 1953
Films set in 1967
Films set in 1973
Films set in Hanoi
Films set in Maryland
Films shot in New Orleans
Television films based on books
Vietnam War prisoner of war films
War films based on actual events
War television films
Works about John McCain